No Control is an album by American band Turbo Fruits, which was released on April 21, 2015. All songs were produced by Jeremy Ferguson, except The Way I Want You and No Reason to Stay, which were produced by The Black Keys drummer Patrick Carney.

Track listing

Personnel

Turbo Fruits
  Jonas Stein – vocals, guitar
  Kingsley Brock – vocals, guitar
  Dave McCowen – bass guitar
  Matt Hearn – drums

Additional personnel
  Matt Rowland – keys
  Jeremy Ferguson – keys, guitar

Production
  Jeremy Ferguson & Patrick Carney
  Mastered by Marc Chevalier
  Engineered by Matt Legge & Roger Moutenot
  Cover art by Jamin Orrall
  Band photo by Karlo X Ramos
  Layout & design by Isaiah Lujan

References

External links
 Official Website
 YouTube Channel
 Facebook Profile
 Twitter
 Bandcamp Profile

2015 albums